Appointment in Honduras is a 1953 American adventure film directed by Jacques Tourneur and starring Glenn Ford, Ann Sheridan, and Zachary Scott.

Plot 
Taking place in 1910, during a fictional revolution in Honduras, Jim Corbett (Glenn Ford) was hired to ensure that a large sum of money came to the deposed political leader. Sylvia Sheppard (Ann Sheridan) and her wealthy husband Harry Sheppard (Zachary Scott) are unwilling hostages of Corbett, who is accompanied through the jungle by several wanted criminals.  Sylvia, ever the unfaithful wife, eventually falls in love with Corbett.  They encounter various dangers, including crocodiles, "tiger fish," large snakes, biting ants, a huge swarm of some unnamed, assumed stinging insects, malaria, and armed insurgents.

Cast

References

Chris Fujiwara. Jacques Tourneur: the cinema of nightfall

External links 

Glenn Ford biography

1953 films
1950s adventure drama films
American adventure drama films
1950s English-language films
Films set in 1910
Films set in Honduras
Films set in jungles
American historical adventure films
1950s historical adventure films
1953 drama films
1950s American films